Midnight Massacre may refer to:

 Utah prisoner of war massacre, July 1945
 The trade of Tom Seaver to the Cincinnati Reds during the 1977 New York Mets season
 Killings of the Midnight Sons, a fictional team of supernatural superheroes in the Marvel Comics universe